Peter Turner may refer to:

 Peter Turner (writer and photographer) (1947–2005), London-born photographer and writer
 Peter Turner (physician) (1542–1614), English Paracelsian and Member of Parliament 
 Peter Turner (mathematician) (1586–1652), English mathematician, son of the physician
 Pete Turner (musician), British musician and songwriter
 Pete Turner (photographer) (1934–2017), American photographer
 Peter Turner (Australian footballer) (born 1974), Australian rules footballer
 Peter Turner (Scottish footballer) (1876–1970), Scottish Association football player
 Peter Turner (rugby league), New Zealand rugby league international
 Peter H. Turner (1813–1885), American pioneer and politician